Proto-Central Pacific (abbreviated as PCP) is the reconstructed ancestor of the Central Pacific languages. It belongs to the Oceanic branch of the Austronesian languages.

It was first proposed by George W. Grace in 1959, who also named the subgroup in 1967. It was reconstructed by C.F. Hockett in 1976.

Descendants
Proto-Central Pacific, originally spoken by Lapita settlers in Fiji three millennia ago, separated into a dialect network, consisting of what would become a western dialect (ancestral to Rotuman and western Fijian dialects) and an eastern dialect (ancestral to eastern Fijian dialects and Proto-Polynesian). Later, the dialects that remained in Fiji converged back, eventually becoming more similar, leading to the present-day Fijian language.

Phonology
The phonology of Proto-Central Pacific, according to Geraghty (1986), are:
 {| class="wikitable" style="text-align:center"
|+Consonants
! colspan="2" |
!Bilabial
!Dental
!Alveolar
!Palatal
!Velar
!Labiovelar
!Glottal
|-
! rowspan="2" |Stop
!prenasalized
|* 
|
|* , * 
|
|* 
|
|
|-
!voiceless
|* 
|* 
|
|
|* 
|* 
|*
|-
! colspan="2" |Nasal
|* 
|* 
|
|* 
|* 
|* 
|
|-
! colspan="2" |Fricative
|* 
|* 
|* 
|* 
|* 
|
|
|-
! colspan="2" |Affricate
|
|
|
|* 
|
|
|
|-
! colspan="2" |Approximant
|
|
|* , * 
|* 
|
|* 
|
|}

 {| class="wikitable" style="text-align:center"
|+Vowels
! 
! Front
! Back
|-
!Close
| align=center | * , * 
| align=center | * , * 
|-
!Close-mid
| align=center | * , * 
| align=center | * , * 
|-
!Open
| colspan="2" style="text-align:center;"| * , * 
|}

Example sentence
From Kikusawa (2000, 167)

References